This is a list of cricketers who have played matches for the Bahawalpur cricket team.

 Azhar Abbas
 Agha Saadat Ali
 Shabbir Ahmed
 Shakeel Ahmed
 Zulfiqar Ahmed
 Israr Ali
 Mohammad Ali
 Sajid Ali
 Sher Ali
 Alimuddin
 Anwar Khan
 Shahid Anwar
 Imranullah Aslam
 Ataullah
 Aamer Bhatti
 Javed Bhatti
 Tauseef Bukhari
 Khalid Butt
 Iqbal Chaudhri
 Amir Elahi
 Aamer Gul
 Zulqarnain Haider
 Ijaz Hussain
 Kamran Hussain
 Murtaza Hussain
 Mohammad Imran
 Asif Iqbal
 Bilal Khilji
 Naved Latif
 Majid Majeed
 Maqsood Ahmed
 Tahir Maqsood
 Fahad Masood
 Hanif Mohammad
 Khan Mohammad
 Wazir Mohammad
 Zaeem Raja
 Azmat Rana
 Mansoor Rana
 Ali Raza
 Azhar Shafiq
 Shujauddin Butt
 Iqbal Sikander
 Mohammad Talha
 Hammad Tariq
 Usman Tariq
 Gulraiz Wali
 Mohammad Yousuf
 Mohammad Zahid

References 

Lists of Pakistani cricketers